Enchocrates is a genus of moths of the family Oecophoridae.

Species
Enchocrates glaucopis Meyrick, 1883
Enchocrates habroschema (Turner, 1946)
Enchocrates phaedryntis Meyrick, 1888
Enchocrates picrophylla Meyrick, 1886
Enchocrates vesperascens Meyrick, 1921

References

"Enchocrates Meyrick, 1883" at Markku Savela's Lepidoptera and Some Other Life Forms

 
Depressariinae